Cindy J. Carlson is an American politician and businesswoman serving as a member of the Idaho Senate for the 7th district. Elected in November 2022, she assumed office on December 1, 2022.

Early life and education 
Carlson was born in California and raised in Riggins, Idaho. She graduated from Salmon River High School and took courses at Treasure Valley Community College in Ontario, Oregon.

Career 
Outside of politics, Carlson works as a real estate broker and owns a business that provides helicopters for tourism, power line construction, fire fighting, construction, and agricultural services. She was elected to the Idaho Senate in November 2022.

References 

Living people
Idaho Republicans
Idaho state senators
People from Idaho County, Idaho
Women state legislators in Idaho
Year of birth missing (living people)